Lovestone are a Finnish rock band that formed during the summer of 1999 in Helsinki, Finland. Their genre is a mix of alternative rock, folk rock and psychedelic rock. Their influences are Led Zeppelin, The Doors, The Who and The Black Crowes.

Drummer Janne Heiskanen played in The Rasmus, and appears on their three first albums. Lovestone are not as well known as The Rasmus. They have yet to release any albums and have played many concerts. The only song that has been recorded is Wrong Turn, and is available to listen at the band's MySpace profile.

Band members 
 Robin: vocals
 Kaide: Guitar
 Tomppa: Guitar
 Tero: Bass
 Janne Heiskanen: drums

External links 
 Lovestone's official website

The Rasmus
Lovestone
Musical groups established in 1999
1999 establishments in Finland